Our Lady of Jazłowiec is an iconic representation in Carrara marble of Mary, mother of Jesus, commissioned in 1883 in Rome for the convent of the Sisters of the Immaculate Conception of the Blessed Virgin Mary in the historic village of Yazlovets, then in Austrian-occupied Poland, now in Ukraine, still a place of pilgrimage. The neoclassical carving by Tomasz Oskar Sosnowski, is 170cm high on a plinth 24cm wide.

In 1883 the statue was blessed by Archbishop Zygmunt Szczęsny Feliński.
In 1919 the 14th Jazlowiec Uhlan Regiment declared the image to be their Hetman.
On 9th July 1939, the statue, granted a Canonical coronation by Pope Pius XII, was crowned by Cardinal August Hlond
In May 1946 the statue was moved, with the remaining religious, to Szymanów in Poland.

A faithful copy of the original has since been installed in Yazlovets.

See also
 List of Pontifically crowned images #Ukraine

References

Bibliography 
 Z dawna Polski Tyś Królową. Przewodnik po sanktuariach maryjnych. Szymanów, 1996 (in Polish).

External links 
 close-ups of the sculptured image and intimations of masculine adulation
 List of Marian shrines in Poland, from University of Dayton, Ohio
 A description in Polish of the statue and its history.

1883 establishments in Austria-Hungary
1883 establishments in Poland
Catholic Church in Poland
Catholic devotions
Catholic sculpture
Eastern Catholic shrines
The Most Holy Virgin Mary, Queen of Poland
Latin Church
Mariology
Shrines to the Virgin Mary
Catholic pilgrimage sites
Titles of Mary
Roman Catholic shrines in Poland
Our Lady of Jazłowiec
Virgin Mary in art
19th-century religious buildings and structures in Poland